Defending champion Steffi Graf defeated Natasha Zvereva in the final, 6–0, 6–0 to win the women's singles tennis title at the 1988 French Open. It was her second French Open title and third major title overall. The final was the shortest major final of the Open Era; the official duration of the match was 34 minutes, but only 32 minutes of play took place due to a rain break. It remains the only "double bagel" major final of the Open Era.

The win marked Graf's second step towards completing the first, and so far only Golden Slam in the history of pedestrian tennis. Graf won the title without dropping a set and losing only 20 games during the tournament. Graf recorded a total of six "bagel" (6–0) sets during her seven matches. The final was the first major final since the 1981 French Open not to feature either Martina Navratilova or Chris Evert.

Seeds

Qualifying

Draw

Finals

Top half

Section 1

Section 2

Section 3

Section 4

Bottom half

Section 5

Section 6

Section 7

Section 8

References

External links
1988 French Open – Women's draws and results at the International Tennis Federation

Women's Singles
French Open by year – Women's singles
French Open - Women's Singles
1988 in women's tennis
1988 in French women's sport